Black Madonna is the first studio album by American alternative metal duo The Austerity Program, released in 2007 through Hydra Head Records. The title has nothing to do with the singer Madonna, nor does it relate to the Black Madonna statue. Rather, it was picked as a name for the record because "[they] actually have no idea".

Track listing

Personnel
The Austerity Program
Thad Calabrese - Bass
Drum Machine - Percussion
Justin Foley - Guitar, Vocals

Production
John Golden - Mastering
John Hastie - Reproduction assistant
Jon Wright - Additional engineering
The Austerity Program - Music, photography, art direction
A. Turner - Design
James O'Mara - Construction

References

2007 debut albums
The Austerity Program albums
Hydra Head Records albums